Riders of the Timberline is a 1941 American Western film directed by Lesley Selander and written by J. Benton Cheney. The film stars William Boyd, Andy Clyde, Tom Tyler, Brad King, Victor Jory, Eleanor Stewart, J. Farrell MacDonald and Anna Q. Nilsson. The film was released on September 17, 1941, by Paramount Pictures.

This was the 38th entry in the "Hopalong Cassidy" western series.

Plot

Cast 
 William Boyd as Hopalong Cassidy
 Andy Clyde as California Carlson
 Brad King as Johnny Nelson
 Victor Jory as Baptiste Deschamp
 Eleanor Stewart as Elaine Kerrigan
 J. Farrell MacDonald as Jim Kerrigan
 Anna Q. Nilsson as Donna Ryan
 Tom Tyler as Henchman Bill Slade
 Edward Keane as Preston Yates
 Hal Taliaferro as Ed Petrie
 Mickey Eissa as Larry
 The Guardsmen Quartet as Singing Lumbermen

References

External links 
 
 
 
 

1941 films
American black-and-white films
1940s English-language films
Paramount Pictures films
American Western (genre) films
1941 Western (genre) films
Films directed by Lesley Selander
Films set in forests
Films about lumberjacks
Hopalong Cassidy films
1940s American films